Cultural and Social History is a peer-reviewed academic journal covering cultural and social history published by Routledge five times a year on behalf of the Social History Society. It was established in 2004.

Abstracting and indexing
The journal is abstracted and indexed in:

 America: History of Life
 Australian Research Council 2010 rankings – Grade A
 British Humanities Index, Historical Abstracts
 IBR International Bibliography of Book Reviews of Scholarly Literature in the Humanities and Social Sciences
 IBZ International Bibliography of Periodical Literature on the Humanities and Social Sciences
 ISI Arts and Humanities Citation Index
 Linguistics and Language Behavior Abstracts
 PAIS Public Affairs
 Information Service International
 Scopus
 Social Science Abstracts

References

External links
 

2004 establishments in the United Kingdom
Publications established in 2004
English-language journals
Social history journals
Cultural history
Cultural journals
5 times per year journals